False castor oil plant is the common name of two plants:

 Datura stramonium (jimsonweed, thorn-apple, devil's snare), from Mexico
 Fatsia japonica (fatsi, paperplant), from Japan

See also 
 castor oil plant